Austrocidaria venustatis is a species of moth of the family Geometridae. It endemic to New Zealand and has been collected in Southland. Adults of this species are on the wing in December.

Taxonomy 
This species was first described by John Tenison Salmon in 1946 using a specimen collected at Lake Gunn in the Eglinton Valley in December, 1944. Salmon originally named the species Hydriomena venustatis. In 1950 George Hudson described and illustrated this species. In 1988 John S. Dugdale placed this species in the genus Austrocidaria. The male holotype is held at Te Papa.

Description
Hudson described this species as follows:
Hudson recognised that this species was visually similar to Austrocidaria similata but stated that it could be distinguished from that species based on its morphology.

Distribution

A. venustatis is endemic to New Zealand. It has been collected in Southland.

Behaviour 
Adults are on the wing in December.

References

Xanthorhoini
Moths of New Zealand
Moths described in 1946
Endemic fauna of New Zealand
Taxa named by John Salmon
Endemic moths of New Zealand